Broadmeadows is a village in the Scottish Borders area of Scotland, on the A708 near Selkirk.

Places nearby include Boleside, Bowhill, Caddonfoot, Ettrickbridge, Lindean, Philiphaugh, Sundhope, Yarrow Water and Yarrowford.

See also
List of places in the Scottish Borders
List of places in Scotland

External links
RCAHMS record for Broadmeadows, Bridge
SCRAN image: Opening of the first Youth Hostel at Broadmeadows, Yarrow Valley
SCRAN image: Shepherd and family at Yarrowford, Broadmeadows
Scottish Youth Hostel Association: Broadmeadows hostel, the first SYHA hostel in Scotland, started in 1931
Selkirk News: Flooding in Selkirk and Broadmeadows
The Sir Walter Scott Way

Villages in the Scottish Borders